Cymbalaria muralis, commonly called ivy-leaved toadflax or Kenilworth ivy, is a low, spreading, viney plant with small purple flowers, native to southern Europe. It belongs to the plantain family (Plantaginaceae), and is introduced in North America, Australia, and elsewhere. The flower stalk is unusual for seeking light until it is fertilized, after which it grows away from the light. Other names include coliseum ivy, Oxford ivy, mother of thousands, pennywort, and wandering sailor.

Description and habitat
The leaves are evergreen, rounded to heart-shaped, long and wide, 3–7-lobed, alternating on thin stems. The flowers are very small but distinctly spurred, similar in shape to snapdragon flowers. Flowers from May to September.

Distribution 
Cymbalaria muralis is native to Mediterranean climates in south and southwest Europe, the Southern Alps, eastern Yugoslavia, southern Italy and Sicily. It has spread throughout the world as an invasive plant, including the United States, the British Isles, Australia and New Zealand.

It is said to have been introduced into England by accident when a shipment of sculptures was brought to Oxford. It was first introduced early in the 17th century  and was widely planted in the UK up to the 19th century.

Reproduction 
This plant has an unusual method of propagation. The flower stalk is initially positively phototropic and moves towards the light. After fertilisation, it becomes negatively phototropic ("scototropic") and moves away from the light. This results in seed being pushed into dark crevices of rock walls, where it is more likely to germinate.

References

External links

Jepson Manual Treatment
Photo gallery

Plantaginaceae
Flora of Europe
Plants described in 1753
Taxa named by Carl Linnaeus